Providence College for Women, is a women's general degree college located at Coonoor, The Nilgiris District, Tamil Nadu. It was established in the year 1966. The college is affiliated with Bharathiar University. This college offers different courses in arts, commerce and science.

Departments

Science
Mathematics
Computer Science
Botany

Arts and Commerce
Tamil
English
History
Economics
Commerce

Accreditation
The college is  recognized by the University Grants Commission (UGC).

References

External links

Educational institutions established in 1966
1966 establishments in Madras State
Colleges affiliated to Bharathiar University